Luskin is a Jewish surname of Russian origin.  It is a 
habitational name for a person from Luski, a village now in Belarus.
Notable people with the surname include:

 Casey Luskin, American attorney and author who promotes intelligent design
 Donald Luskin (born 1954), Chief Investment Officer for Trend Macrolytics, LLC
 Eugene Luskin, CEO and founder of Lagotek
 Harvey Molotch (born Harvey Luskin), American sociologist  
 Robert Luskin (born 1950), attorney and partner in the law firm of Paul Hastings LLP

Luskin's was a home appliance store in the Baltimore area founded by Jack Luskin.